Laura Stahl is an American voice actress and voice director, known for her work on anime dubs for Bang Zoom! Entertainment, Studiopolis, NYAV Post and SDI Media. She is of African American and Jewish descent.

Filmography

Anime series

Animated series

Films

Video games

References

External links
 

Living people
American video game actresses
American voice actresses
Year of birth missing (living people)
21st-century African-American women
21st-century African-American people
21st-century American actresses
21st-century American Jews